Comité Européen des groupements de constructeurs du machinisme agricole (CEMA aisbl) is the European association representing the agricultural machinery industry in Europe.

Introduction
CEMA is a European umbrella organization, composed of 11 national member associations. The CEMA network represents both large multinational companies and numerous European SMEs active in the sector, producing a large range of machines that cover any activity in the field from seeding to harvesting, as well as equipment for livestock management.
 
The agricultural machinery industry in Europe comprises about 7,000 manufacturers, producing more than 450 different types of machines with an annual turnover of about €40 billion (EU28 - 2016) and 150,000 direct employees. 

CEMA was established during the first General Assembly in London on 10 July 1959. CEMA is currently headquartered in Brussels and it carries out activities mainly in the fields of European agriculture, industrial policy, internal market, digital agriculture, trade, etc. The organisation is listed in the Transparency Register of the European Commission.

CEMA - the voice of the Agricultural Machinery Industry in Europe
The main activities of CEMA consist of defending and promoting the interests of the agricultural machinery industry towards the European institutions. CEMA also coordinates the work of national member associations on various relevant regulatory and policy topics, providing a common European industry view on them. The majority of those topics are related to safety and (cyber)security of automated, connected, agricultural machinery for road circulation and working in the field, to achieve a sustainable, circular and carbon-free agriculture, as well as to trade issues, homologation, etc. CEMA participates to different European Commission expert groups.  

CEMA also organizes several events showcasing the industry and its innovative solutions. Every other year it holds a two-day ‘CEMA Summit’ in Brussels, to bring together industry leaders, EU decision-makers, farmers’ representatives, and agri-food stakeholders to discuss the latest EU policy developments and challenges ahead for the sector. The next edition of the CEMA Summit will take place in 2023.
CEMA takes part to a number of EU-funded research and innovation projects under the framework of Horizon 2020, Horizon Europe and Digital Europe Programme.

Structure
CEMA is a network of national organisations, which come together in the General Assembly. The General Assembly elects the Board of Directors, which oversees and controls the work of CEMA and its different working groups. The Board of Directors nominates a Technical Board. Specific technical topics are dealt with in dedicated Project Teams (PTs) consisting of representatives of national associations and industry. The CEMA Secretariat in Brussels coordinates contacts and relationships with national associations, as well as with other stakeholder organizations and European bodies. 

The current president of CEMA is Thierry Krier (KUHN, AXEMA), and the vice presidents are Alessandro Malavolti (AMA, FederUnacoma), Paul Snauwaert (CNH Industrial) and Anthony van der Ley (LEMKEN, VDMA). The Secretary General of CEMA is Jelte Wiersma.

Member Associations
  AEA
  Agoria
  ANSEMAT
  AXEMA
  Fedecom
  FMMI
  FEDERUNACOMA
  VDMA
  DAI

Associated Members
  PIGMiUR
  TARMAKBIR

References

Publications
 European Agricultural Machinery Industry Report
 The role of agricultural machinery in decarbonising agriculture 
 Smart Agriculture Solutions support EU Eco-Schemes 
 Full deployment of agricultural machinery data-sharing: technical challenges & solutions

External links
 Official website CEMA

Agricultural machinery
International trade associations
International organisations based in Belgium
Agricultural organisations based in Belgium